Allison Elaine Bailey (born 1970) is a barrister specialising in criminal defence law who works in London, England. Bailey initiated an employment tribunal claim against her legal chambers and Stonewall in 2020. The case has attracted public and media attention, particularly in relation to the Diversity Champions programme.

Early life and education 
Bailey was born and grew up in Cowley, Oxfordshire. Her parents are Jamaican. She achieved a First class degree from the University of Manchester and worked part-time as a housing support worker with women and children survivors of sexual violence. Bailey describes herself as a "a feminist, a lesbian, a lifelong campaigner for racial equality, lesbian, gay, and bisexual rights". She became involved in protest and activism and spent a night in jail for a peaceful protest of the acquittal of the officers involved in the beating of Rodney King. She studied for postgraduate law qualifications and was called to the Bar of England and Wales by Middle Temple in July 2001.

Discrimination action case 
In October 2019, Bailey co-founded the LGB Alliance, an advocacy group and registered charity which opposes LGBT registered charity Stonewall's policies on transgender issues; she acclaimed the newly formed group on Twitter and said that "gender extremism is about to meet its match." Her chambers, Garden Court Chambers, announced it would launch an internal investigation after it received complaints alleging potential transphobia over her social media use and her involvement with the LGB Alliance.

In March 2020, she announced that she would be suing Garden Court and Stonewall in a discrimination action. She gave the following explanation of her reasons behind the case:First and foremost, I hope that my legal action will bring me justice. I also hope that it can stop Stonewall from policing free speech via its Diversity Champions scheme. Stonewall have signed up many companies, public bodies, voluntary sector organisations and government departments to their manifesto and their value system regarding trans rights. What is called Stonewall Law. Without most of the public realising it, a large swathe of British employers have signed up to the Stonewall value system. It has done this by trying to silence and vilify women like me who have genuine concerns about how its approach to trans inclusivity conflicts with the protections, safety and dignity of women, girls, children and LGB people.The case attracted widespread media coverage, notably in the law press amid debates about freedom of speech and workplace diversity schemes.

Bailey alleged that Stonewall was in breach of the Equality Act 2010. She claimed victimisation discrimination on the grounds of sex and/or sexual orientation against Garden Court, and that Stonewall instructed, caused or induced that unlawful conduct.

She used the CrowdJustice fundraising platform to raise funds for the case, raising £60,000. CrowdJustice later closed donations to the case, stating that "parts of the case page, unconnected to the facts of the actual legal case, could be considered to promote hate, abuse or harassment towards a minority community, in contravention of our terms." In response, Bailey stated that "I was not prepared to edit out and censor my page in the way CrowdJustice demanded." She was afterwards able to raise £500,000 for the case via crowdfunding.

In December 2021, it was reported that a judge ruled against Stonewall and Garden Court to allow an amendment of the discrimination claim to include arguments based on the ground of philosophical belief, as allowed in the case of Maya Forstater v Centre for Global Development.

The hearing of Bailey's tribunal case began on 25 April 2022, considering a number of claims against Garden Court Chambers and against Stonewall. The tribunal's decision was published in July 2022. In terms of the claims against Garden Court Chambers, the tribunal ruled in favour of her claim that Garden Court Chambers had discriminated against her by tweeting that complaints against her tweets would be investigated. It also ruled in favour of her claims that Garden Court Chambers had discriminated against her and victimised her by concluding in that investigation that two of her tweets had potentially breached the core duties of barristers. One of the tweets was about the concept of a "cotton ceiling" and the other regarded her belief that Stonewall has a dangerous agenda regarding gender self-identification. She was consequentially awarded £22,000 in damages for injury to feelings. The tribunal ruled against her other claims against Garden Court Chambers, ruling that she had not lost income or work opportunities due to the complaints, nor that that Garden Court Chambers had a systemic policy of treating gender-critical beliefs as bigoted. The tribunal ruled against all her claims against Stonewall, ruling that Stonewall did not influence the complaints procedure or the policies of Garden Court Chambers. Bailey is appealing the ruling on the claims against Stonewall.

Media coverage 
In their article "The Gender Wars, Academic Freedom and Education", Judith Suissa and Alice Sullivan list Bailey, alongside Sonia Appleby, Maya Forstater, and J. K. Rowling, as examples of women who have experienced campaigns of harassment because they speak publicly on sex and gender identity.

Sonia Sodha, leader writer in The Observer, commented "That a gay rights charity stands accused of discriminating against a black lesbian illustrates how wrong it is to assume the rights and interests of all LGBTQ+ people perfectly align. Of course, that has not stopped white men telling Bailey that her concept of womanhood is not only wrong, it makes her a bigot."

References 

Living people
English barristers
English lesbians
British feminists
Lesbian feminists
LGBT Black British people
Black British activists
Feminism and transgender
LGBT-related controversies in the United Kingdom
Transgender case law in the United Kingdom
Equality rights
British women's rights activists
1970 births
British people of Jamaican descent